Andreas Rieth Homestead is a historic home located near Pennsburg at Marlborough Township, Montgomery County, Pennsylvania. The property has two contributing buildings.  The Rieth Farmhouse is a -story, stone dwelling originally built in the Germanic style, but later modified to a Georgian plan. It has a rear kitchen addition. Also on the property is a former 1/2-story, stone bank house later converted to a bank barn.

It was added to the National Register of Historic Places in 1973.

References

Houses on the National Register of Historic Places in Pennsylvania
Georgian architecture in Pennsylvania
Houses in Montgomery County, Pennsylvania
National Register of Historic Places in Montgomery County, Pennsylvania